Quitzdorf Dam is a dam near Quitzdorf am See, Germany. It is located in the municipality of Quitzdorf am See in the Upper Lusatia region of Saxony. The lake is used for service water supply, flood protection, low water elevation, recreation and nature conservation. In terms of area, it is the largest reservoir in Saxony and was the largest inland water body in Saxony until the Lohsa II and Bärwalde reservoirs were flooded. According to criteria established by the International Commission on Large Dams, it is a large dam.

Tourism
Many of the lake's shores have been redeveloped after the reunification of Germany and sandy beaches have been created. There are two campsites by the lake and numerous accommodation facilities.

The reservoir has had persistent problems with cyanobacteria. As of 2020, a comprehensive refurbishment is in the planning phase.

Gallery

References

See also
List of dams and reservoirs in Germany

Dams completed in 1972
Dams in Saxony